Bear Glacier may refer to one of several glaciers:

Bear Glacier Provincial Park in British Columbia, Canada
Bear Glacier within Kenai Fjords National Park in Alaska, United States
Medvezhiy Glacier ("Bear Glacier" in Russian) in Tajikistan

See also
Glacier bear